Tennis at Newport is an oil on canvas painting of 1919 by the American artist George Bellows. Bellows depicts one of the earliest editions of the Newport Casino Invitational, a major event on the high society calendar.

References

1919 paintings
Paintings by George Bellows
Paintings in the collection of the Metropolitan Museum of Art